70P/Kojima is a periodic comet in the Solar System with a current orbital period of 7.05 years.

It was discovered at Ishiki, Aichi, Japan by Nobuhisa Kojima, who estimated its brightness at magnitude 14. Its parabolic orbit was calculated by Kiichirō Furukawa to have a perihelion date of 1 November 1970. This was revised on the basis of further observations to an elliptical orbit with a perihelion of 7 October and an orbital period of 6.16.

Hiroki Kosai and Furukawa relocated the comet on 9 December 1977 at its next predicted apparition with the 105 cm Schmidt telescope at the Kiso Station of the Tokyo Astronomical Observatory, estimating its brightness at magnitude 16. It was subsequently observed in 1985/1986 and 1992/1994 by Spacewatch with magnitudes of 20 and 22.1. The comet then passed close to Jupiter, which reduced the perihelion distance from 2.4 AU (Astronomical Unit) to 1.97 AU, increased the eccentricity from 0.39 to 0.46 and reduced the orbital period from 7.85 to 6.99 years.

See also
 List of numbered comets

References
 

Periodic comets
0070
Comets in 2014
19701227